Kʼan Chitam, also known as Kan Boar and Kʼan Ak (November 26, 415? – 486?), was an ajaw of the Maya city of Tikal. He took the throne on 8 August 458. He was son of Sihyaj Chan Kʼawiil II and Lady Ahiin. The monuments associated with Kʼan Chitam are Stelae 2?, 9, 13 and 40.

Notes

Footnotes

References

Rulers of Tikal
5th century in the Maya civilization
5th-century monarchs in North America
410s births
480s deaths